This article contains a list in alphabetical order of rugby league players who have played for France in full international matches since the team's first match in 1934.

A

B

C

D

E

F

G

H
 Jean Hatchondo
 Lilian Hebert
 Rachid Hechiche
 Didier Hermet
 Jérôme Hermet
 Maxime Hérold
 Sylvain Houles
 Guy Husson

I
 Bernard Imbert
 Jacky Imbert
 Jean-Marie Imbert
 Adam Innes

J

K
 Jean Kaczmareck
 Albert Kaempf
 Etienne Kaminski
 Fernand Kaminski
 Younes Khattabi
 Mathieu Khedimi
 Mark Kheirallah
 Joseph Krawzyck
 Mourad Kriouache

L

M

N
 Michel Naudo
 Patrick Nauroy
 Quentin Nauroy
 Romain Navarrete
 Jean Nedorezoff
 Ulysse Negrier
 Patrick Noguera
 Francois Nogueres
 Francois Nouel
 Marcel Nourrit

O
 Roger Ourliac

P

Q
 Aldo Quaglio
 Jean-Louis Quintilla

R

S

T

U
 Ambroise Ulma

V

W
 Eric Waligunda
 John Wiagafa
 John Wilson
 Aaron Wood
 Patrick Wosniack
 Vincent Wulf
 James Wynne

Y
 Bagdad Yaha
 Fouad Yaha
 Valentin Yesa

Z
 Charles Zalduendo
 Frédéric Zitter

References

 
France